HMS Victoria was the last British wooden first-rate three-decked ship of the line commissioned for sea service.

With a displacement of 6,959 tons, she was the largest ever wooden battleship. She was also the world's largest warship until the completion of HMS Warrior, Britain's first ironclad battleship, in 1861.

Her hull was heavily strapped with diagonal iron riders for extra stability. Victoria was the first British battleship with two funnels.

She was armed with 121 guns (32 8-inch smooth-bore muzzle-loading on the lower gun deck, 30  on the central gun deck, 32 32-pounders on the upper gun deck, 26 32-pounders and one 68-pounder on the upper deck).Victoria was ordered on 6 January 1855, laid down on 1 April 1856 at Portsmouth, and launched on 12 November 1859. She cost a total of £150,578  (equivalent to £ in 2010) and had a complement of 1,000.

Her Maudslay engine was powered by 8 boilers and developed 4,403 ihp.

After completion Victoria was laid up as part of the reserve fleet at Portsmouth from 1860 to 1864.

She first entered active service on 2 November 1864, when she became Flagship of the Mediterranean fleet under Vice-Admiral Robert Smart and Captain James Graham Goodenough (from 1865: Rear-Admiral Lord Clarence Paget, Captain Alan Henry Gardner). Victoria was based in Malta until 1867 when she returned home. Her armament had been reduced to 102 guns.

Her last public appearance came at the 1867 Spithead Review and she was paid off on 7 August 1867. She became part of the reserve fleet at Portsmouth again, eventually had her armament reduced to 12 guns, and was sold for scrapping on 31 May 1893 without ever having fired her guns in anger.Victorias slightly enlarged sister ship was HMS Howe.

ReferencesNotesBibliography'''

 Andrew Lambert: "Battleships in Transition" (published by Conway Maritime Press Ltd, 1984), 
 NAVIES IN TRANSITION: The perfecting of the wooden man-of-war in the context of early 19th century international politics. A small guide to surviving and reconstructed 19th century warships from the pre-ironclad era in naval architecture. By Dirk J. Vries
 Battleships-Cruisers Naval History website.

External links
 

Ships of the line of the Royal Navy
1859 ships
Victorian-era ships of the line of the United Kingdom